is the second and final studio album by Japanese entertainer Nana Katase. Released by Avex Trax on April 21, 2004, the album features covers of seven popular J-pop songs from the 1980s. It was released in two editions: CD only and CD with DVD.

The album peaked at No. 24 on Oricon's weekly albums chart.

Track listing

Charts

References

External links
 
 

2004 albums
Japanese-language albums
Covers albums
Avex Trax albums